The following is a list of superhero television series.

DC and Marvel
Because so many DC and Marvel comic books based on superheroes have been adapted into television series, they have separate entries:

 List of television series based on DC Comics
 List of unproduced DC Comics projects
 List of television series based on Marvel Comics
 List of unproduced television projects based on Marvel Comics

Toei Company
Japan's Toei Company has also produced numerous tokusatsu superhero television shows, listed in the following article:

 List of superhero productions created by Toei

Independents
Independent companies also produced a few superhero television shows aside from DC, Marvel and Toei, listed in the following articles:

 List of television series and films based on Archie Comics
 List of television series and films based on Boom! Studios publications
 List of television series based on Dark Horse Comics
 List of unproduced Dark Horse Comics projects
 List of television series and films based on Harvey Comics publications
 List of television series and films based on IDW Publishing publications
 List of television series and films based on Image Comics
 List of unproduced Image Comics projects
 List of television series and films based on Oni Press publications
 List of TV series based on French-language comics
 List of television series based on comic strips

Miscellaneous live-action
This table does not list TV series based on properties owned by DC Comics, Marvel Comics, etc.

Animated

See also
List of American superhero TV shows
List of television programs based on comics
List of superhero films

Footnotes

References